José Fedor Rey  Javier Delgado (1 December 1951 in Cali – 30 June 2002 in Palmira, Valle del Cauca) was a Colombian guerrilla, and leader of the Ricardo Franco Front.

References

1951 births
2002 deaths
People from Cali
Colombian guerrillas